Peter Voss, Thief of Millions (German: Peter Voss, der Millionendieb) is a 1932 German comedy crime film directed by Ewald André Dupont and starring Willi Forst, Alice Treff, and Paul Hörbiger. It was based on the 1913 novel of the same title by Ewald Gerhard Seeliger which has been adapted into a number of films including previously in 1921 and later in 1946. It was the second to last film made by Dupont in Germany before he was forced to flee to the United States following the rise of the Nazi Party.

It was shot at the Emelka Studios in Munich with location shooting in Marseille. The film's sets were designed by the art directors Ludwig Reiber and Willy Reiber.

Cast
 Willi Forst as Peter Voß
 Alice Treff as Polly
 Paul Hörbiger as Bobby Dodd
 Ida Wüst as Madame Bianca
 Otto Wernicke as Pitt
 Hans Hermann Schaufuß as Schilling
 Edith d'Amara as Schilling's secretary
 Johannes Roth as asthmatical man
 Josef Eichheim as Plaschke
 Will Dohm as night club's innkeeper
 Willi Schaeffers as Arab
 Gregori Chmara as Pasha
 Luise Werckmeister as female corporal
 Aenne Goerling as chanteuse
 Therese Giehse as cleaner
 Kurt Horwitz as 1st broker
 O. E. Hasse as 2nd broker
 Henri Hertsch as 3rd broker
 Erika Mann as 1st tour guide
 Rudolf Amend as 2nd tour guide
 Fritz Schlenk as Purser
 Reinhold Bernt as newspaper man

References

Bibliography 
 Klaus, Ulrich J. Deutsche Tonfilme: Jahrgang 1932. Klaus-Archiv, 1988.

External links
 

1930s adventure comedy films
1930s crime comedy films
German adventure comedy films
German crime comedy films
Films of the Weimar Republic
Films directed by E. A. Dupont
Films based on German novels
Remakes of German films
Sound film remakes of silent films
Bavaria Film films
German black-and-white films
Films shot in Marseille
Films shot at Bavaria Studios
1930s German-language films
1930s German films